Martinez (Spanish: Martínez) is a city and the county seat of Contra Costa County, California, United States, in the East Bay region of the San Francisco Bay Area. Located on the southern shore of the Carquinez Strait, the city's population was 38,290 at the 2020 census. The city is named after Californio ranchero Ygnacio Martínez, having been founded on his Rancho El Pinole. Martinez is known for its historic center and its waterfront.

History 

In 1824, the western side of Martinez, Alhambra Valley was included in the Rancho El Pinole Mexican land grant to Ygnacio Martínez.  East of these lands was the Rancho Las Juntas, a grant made to Irish born William Welch in 1844; his land lay between the lands of Martinez and Pacheco.

In 1847, Dr. Robert Semple contracted to provide ferry service from Martinez to Benicia, which for many years was the only crossing on the Carquinez Strait. By 1849, Martínez served as a way station for the California Gold Rush.  The town was laid out in 1849 by Col. William M. Smith and named for Martinez. It became the county seat in 1850, but could not incorporate at the time because it lacked the 200 registered voters required, and would not become a city until 1876.

Martinez was the home of naturalist John Muir from 1880 until his death in 1914. He was buried about a mile south of the building that is now the John Muir National Historic Site. Also nearby is the Vicente Martinez Adobe, built in 1849 by the son of Ygnacio Martinez.

The first post office opened in 1851.

In 1860, Martinez played a role in the Pony Express, where riders would take the ferry from Benicia (particularly if they missed the steamer in Sacramento).

The first oil refinery in the Martinez area was built in 1904 at Bull's Head Point, a then-unincorporated waterfront area two miles east of the downtown district. That area soon became known as Mococo, following the 1905 arrival of a smelting works, operated by the Mountain Copper Company (Mo Co Co).

That first facility, operated by the Bull's Head Oil Company, was followed in 1908 by a test refinery built by the Pacific Coast Oil Company.

In 1913, the Golden Eagle facility became the third oil refinery to be built in the area. It was located in the newly-created company town of Avon, immediately to the East of Martinez. A fourth refinery, built by the Shell Oil Company on land adjacent to the Martinez City limits, went online in January 1916. The Shell Oil refining facility is still operational today (Currently owned by PBF Energy), maintaining the city's position as a significant petroleum processing center. The Golden Eagle Refinery (currently owned by Marathon Petroleum Company) was idled in April 2020 as a response to lower petroleum demand during the COVID-19 pandemic.

Folk etymology in Martinez claims the invention of the Martini cocktail and that it is named for the city.

Geography 

The city is largely surrounded by water and regional open-space preserves.  The Martinez–Benicia Bridge carries Highway 680 across the eastern end of the Carquinez Strait to Solano County. The city is a densely built downtown valley threaded by Alhambra Creek and north of Highway 4. Suburban areas stretch south of Highway 4 to join the neighboring city of Pleasant Hill.  Unincorporated areas include the rural Alhambra Valley and the Franklin Canyon area.

The Martinez Regional Shoreline bounds the city to the north along the Carquinez Strait.  Carquinez Strait Regional Shoreline includes the Franklin Hills west of downtown, stretching west to the unincorporated community of Port Costa and the town of Crockett.  Briones Regional Park borders the Alhambra Valley to the south.  Waterbird Regional Preserve and the McNabney Marsh border the city and Highway 680 to the east. Martinez's location at the east end of the Carquinez Strait as it widens to Suisun Bay includes dramatic water views stretching to the Sierra range. From surrounding ridge tops views stretch to nearby Mount Diablo, Mount Saint Helena, Mount Tamalpais, and others.

Martinez is one of the only two places in the Bay Area, the other being Golden Gate Bridge, where the Bay Area Ridge Trail and the San Francisco Bay Trail converge. The Bay Trail is a planned recreational corridor that, when complete, will encircle San Francisco and San Pablo bays with a continuous  network of bicycling and hiking trails. It will connect the shoreline of all nine Bay Area counties, link 47 cities, and cross the major toll bridges in the region, including the Benicia–Martinez Bridge. The Bay Area Ridge Trail ultimately will be a 500+ mile trail encircling the San Francisco Bay along the ridge tops, open to hikers, equestrians, mountain bicyclists, and outdoor enthusiasts of all types. East Bay Regional Park District's Iron Horse Regional Trail will join the Bay Trail along the waterfront, and the Contra Costa Canal Trail threads through the city from Pleasant Hill to the south.

Climate 

Martinez has a mild Mediterranean climate (Köppen climate classification: Csa/b). Summers are warm and dry, with some morning fog during sea breezes. The maritime influence is much less significant than in other parts of the Bay Area that are closer to the Pacific, which causes very high daytime averages compared to San Francisco and Oakland in summer. Winters are wet and cool with occasional frost. The majority of the city is within a USDA hardiness zone of 9b.

Demographics 

The 2020 United States Census reported that Martinez had a population of 38,290. The racial makeup of Martinez was 27,603 (77.1%) White, 1,303 (3.6%) African American, 255 (0.7%) Native American, 2,876 (8.0%) Asian, 121 (0.3%) Pacific Islander, 1,425 (4.0%) from other races, and 2,241 (6.3%) from two or more races. Hispanic or Latino of any race were 5,258 persons (14.7 percent).

The Census reported that 34,528 people (96.4 percent of the population) lived in households, 235 (0.7 percent) lived in non-institutionalized group quarters, and 1,061 (3.0 percent) were institutionalized.

There were 14,287 households, out of which 4,273 (29.9 percent) had children under the age of 18 living in them, 6,782 (47.5 percent) were opposite-sex married couples living together, 1,751 (12.3 percent) had a female householder with no husband present, 640 (4.5 percent) had a male householder with no wife present.  There were 928 (6.5 percent) unmarried opposite-sex partnerships, and 137 (1.0 percent) same-sex married couples or partnerships. 3,920 households (27.4 percent) were made up of individuals, and 1,078 (7.5 percent) had someone living alone who was 65 years of age or older. The average household size was 2.42.  There were 9,173 families (64.2 percent of all households); the average family size was 2.95.

The age distribution of the population showed 7,329 people (20.5 percent) under the age of 18, 2,842 people (7.9 percent) aged 18 to 24, 9,193 people (25.7 percent) aged 25 to 44, 12,121 people (33.8 percent) aged 45 to 64, and 4,339 people (12.1 percent) who were 65 years of age or older.  The median age was 42.2 years. For every 100 females, there were 96.9 males.  For every 100 females age 18 and over, there were 94.8 males.

The homeowner vacancy rate was 1.4 percent; the rental vacancy rate was 4.9 percent.  23,876 people (66.6 percent of the population) lived in owner-occupied housing units and 10,652 people (29.7 percent) lived in rental housing units.

Economy

Top employers 

According to the City's 2021 Comprehensive Annual Financial Report, the top employers in the city are:

Education 

Covering most of Martinez, the Martinez Unified School District encompasses four elementary schools, one middle school, one high school, and two alternative/independent study schools.  Students in K-5 attend John Swett, John Muir, Las Juntas, or Morello Park Elementary School.  Martinez Junior High School serves students in grades 6 through 8. St. Catherine of Siena is a private Catholic school that serves grades K-8. Alhambra High School serves as the district's comprehensive high school.  As of 2006, the district's K-12 enrollment was 4,194.

Part of Martinez is served by the Mount Diablo Unified School District, whose Hidden Valley Elementary School is located in Martinez. St. Catherine of Siena School, a private Roman Catholic elementary school, also serves the Martinez community.

Libraries 
The Martinez Library is part of the Contra Costa County Library and is located in Martinez. The Art Deco style building was placed on the National Register of Historic Places in early 2008.

Media 

Martinez and the surrounding area is served by several local newspapers, including the Martinez News-Gazette, the Martinez Tribune and the East Bay Times.

Martinez is also served by Martinez Patch, a local news website covering community news and events, and the local news and talk blog Claycord.com.

In December 2019, there was a flurry of reports from reliable sources including the Associated Press and the San Francisco Chronicle that the 161 year-old Martinez News-Gazette, one of the longest-running newspapers in California, may have to cease publication. But as of late May 2020, the threatened cessation did not materialize and the newspaper appears to have weathered that storm. The newspaper did cease publication of a print edition effective April 2, 2020 but this was characterized as a temporary measure arising from a lack of advertising revenue. This in turn arose as many local businesses were forced to suspended operations or even ceased to exist, when the area was under shelter in place regulations arising from the Coronavirus Covid-19 pandemic. The newspaper plans to resume a full print edition when the local shelter-in-place restrictions are lifted. The newspaper continued to operate its online news website presence during the pandemic restrictions.

Transportation 

WestCAT provides service to the El Cerrito del Norte BART station. The County Connection is the primary local bus operator providing service throughout the area.  Among its destinations are the Concord, Pleasant Hill, and Walnut Creek BART stations.  The County Connection also provides paratransit service. Tri Delta Transit runs express service between Martinez and eastern Contra Costa County.

State Route 4 runs through Martinez westward to Hercules and eastward through Stockton and the Sierra Nevada to near the border of Nevada. Interstate 680 runs northward across the Benicia–Martinez Bridge toward Sacramento via Interstate 80 and southward toward San Jose.

Rail 
 Amtrak, the national passenger rail system, runs its California Zephyr daily in each direction through Martinez on its route between Emeryville (across the bay from San Francisco) and Chicago, also passing through Sacramento, Reno, Salt Lake City, Denver, and Omaha.
 Amtrak's Coast Starlight operates daily in each direction through Martinez between Seattle and Los Angeles.
 Amtrak California operates its Capitol Corridor trains through Martinez station, providing service several times daily between San Jose to the west and Auburn to the east (via Sacramento).
 Amtrak California also runs its San Joaquin trains through Martinez, providing service several times daily between Oakland to the west and Bakersfield at the south end of the San Joaquin Valley.  Bus connections branch off both the San Joaquin and the Capitol Corridor, providing service as far as San Diego; Las Vegas and Sparks, Nevada; and Medford, Oregon.  One connection originates in Martinez and runs as far north as the Eureka area.
 BART makes a stop called North Concord/Martinez station, although this station lies miles east of the Martinez city limits. The city was overlooked when the system was extended from Concord to Bay Point. However BART's long-term plans include a new line extension running from Fremont and through the I-680 corridor and ending in Martinez.

Sister cities 
According to Sister Cities International, Martinez is paired with:
 Dunbar, Scotland, United Kingdom
 Hanchuan, China
 Milazzo and Stresa, Italy

Notable people 
 Maurice Benard, (b 1963) is an actor known for playing Sonny Corinthos on the ABC soap opera General Hospital.General Hospital
 Yau-Man Chan, (b 1952) is a Malaysian table tennis player, technology executive, and reality television participant.
 Trevor Davis,  (b 1993) is an American football wide receiver 
 Sara Del Rey, (b 1980) is an American professional wrestling trainer and retired professional wrestler,
 Joe DiMaggio,(1914–1999), was a baseball center fielder who played his entire 13-year Hall of fame career in Major League Baseball for the New York Yankees.
 Vince DiMaggio,(1912–1986) was an All-Star Baseball center fielder for the Pittsburgh Pirates
 Ainjel Emme, (b 1978) is an American singer-songwriter, record producer, and recording engineer.
 Robb Flynn,(b 1967) is a musician who is the lead vocalist and rhythm guitarist for heavy metal band Machine Head
 Mark Kozelek, (b 1967) is an American singer, songwriter, guitarist, record producer and occasional actor. 
 Ella Leffland, (b 1931)[1] is an American novelist and short story writer. 
 Tug McGraw, (1944–2004) was a professional baseball relief pitcher and father of singer Tim McGraw
 John Muir,(1838–1914), was a naturalist.
 Richard Rodgers II, (b 1992) is an American football tight end for the Philadelphia Eagles
 Sabato "Simon" Rodia,(1879 or 1886–1965) creator of giant folk art Watts Towers in Los Angeles
 Victor Salva, (b 1958) is an American filmmaker.
 J. Otto Seibold,(born 1960) is an American artist and children's book creator.
 Robert Stephenson, (b 1993) is a professional baseball pitcher for the Colorado Rockies.
 Norv Turner, (b 1952) is an American football coach in the National Football League (NFL)
 Jeff Van Gundy, (b 1962) is an American commentator for ESPN and former basketball coach most famous for his time with the New York Knicks
 Travis Williams, (1946–1991) was an American football player for the Green Bay Packers

See also 
 Martinez beavers

References

External links 

 
 
 Martinez Area Chamber of Commerce
 Main Street Martinez
 Martinez, California Scenes, 1927. Silent amateur film of daily life

 
1876 establishments in California
Carquinez Strait
Cities in Contra Costa County, California
Cities in the San Francisco Bay Area
County seats in California
Incorporated cities and towns in California
Pony Express stations
Populated places established in 1849
Populated places established in 1876
Populated coastal places in California